The 1954 United States Senate election in New Hampshire took place on November 2, 1954. Incumbent Republican Senator Styles Bridges won re-election to a fourth term in office, defeating Democrat Gerald Morin.

Primary elections were held on September 14, 1954.

Republican primary

Candidates
Styles Bridges, incumbent Senator since 1937

Results

Democratic primary

Candidates
Albert R. Courtois
Eugene S. Daniell Jr.
Gerald L. Morin, mayor of Laconia
Frank L. Sullivan

Results

General election

Candidates
Styles Bridges, incumbent Senator since 1937 (Republican)
Gerald L. Morin (Democratic)

Results

See also 
 1954 United States Senate elections

References

Bibliography
 

1954
New Hampshire
United States Senate